House of Councillors elections were held in Japan on 11 July 2004. The House of Councillors consists of 242 members who serve six-year terms. Approximately half the members are elected every three years. At these elections 121 members were elected. Of these 73 were elected from the 47 prefectural districts and 48 were elected from a nationwide list by proportional representation.

Contesting parties
 Government
 Liberal Democratic Party (conservative)
 New Komeito (theocratic Buddhist, conservative)

 Opposition
 Democratic Party (social-democratic/liberal)
 Japanese Communist Party (communist)
 Social Democratic Party (social-democratic)

Results
The opposition Democratic Party won a plurality of the popular vote and seats contested in the election, sweeping the liberal urban areas. The ruling Liberal Democratic Party failed to win in its strongholds but once more received most of its support from the agrarian areas. New Komeito did well, reaching its goals, as did the Social Democratic Party. The Japanese Communist Party did not reach its goals, while independents won the rest of the seats. The Liberal League and Green Political Assembly failed to win any seats.

By prefecture
Elected candidates in bold

Compiled from JANJAN's "The Senkyo" and MIC official results.

Notes:
 All incumbents not running for re-election in their prefectural electoral district are counted as retirements even if they ran in the nationwide proportional representation.
 In a multi-member district, there is no difference between Councillors elected with the highest and lower vote shares. Yet, "top tōsen", i.e. being elected with the highest vote, is considered a special achievement and thus noted where changed from the previous election for the same class of Councillors (1998).
 Niigata is counted as an SDP hold because the elected Councillor joined the SDP parliamentary group.

References

Japan
2004 elections in Japan
House of Councillors (Japan) elections
July 2004 events in Japan
Election and referendum articles with incomplete results